Hodgesiella puplesisi is a moth in the family Cosmopterigidae.

References

Natural History Museum Lepidoptera generic names catalog

Cosmopteriginae